Bay Township may refer to:
 Bay Township, Michigan
 Bay Township, Ottawa County, Ohio

Township name disambiguation pages